The St. Helena Toll Road and Bull Trail also called the Old Bull Trail Road and St. Helena Toll Road is a historic road and trail in Middletown, California.

History
The Old Bull Trail Road was a road built in the 1850s, it later became the St. Helena Toll Road. The landmark plaque was dedicated May 30, 1950.

See also
California Historical Landmarks in Lake County

References

Historic trails and roads in California
History of Lake County, California
California Historical Landmarks
Former toll roads in California